Standish railway station is a closed railway station in Standish, England, situated where the line bridged Rectory Lane (the B5239).

Standish was in the historic county of Lancashire.

History
The station was opened by the North Union Railway in 1838 as "Standish Lane". It was renamed as plain "Standish" by 1844. The North Union later became part of the London and North Western Railway.

The station joined the London Midland and Scottish Railway during the Grouping in 1923 and passed to the London Midland Region of British Railways on nationalisation in 1948.

The station closed in May 1949.

Services
In 1922 eight "Down" (northbound) services called at Standish on Mondays to Saturdays. Most were local services, with a Saturdays Only "Parliamentary", calling at most stations in a five and a half hour journey from Crewe to Carlisle. No trains called on Sundays. The "Up" service was similar.

References

Sources

External links
 The station on a 1948 OS map npe maps
 The station on early OS maps with overlays National Library of Scotland
 The station as Standish Junction on multiple overlain maps Rail Map Online
 Line and mileages Railwaycodes

Disused railway stations in the Metropolitan Borough of Wigan
Former North Union Railway stations
Railway stations in Great Britain opened in 1838
History of the Metropolitan Borough of Wigan
Railway stations in Great Britain closed in 1949
Standish, Greater Manchester